John M. Stefanski is an American attorney and politician serving as a member of the Louisiana House of Representatives. He assumed office on April 10, 2017.

Education 
Stefanski earned a Bachelor of Arts degree in history from Louisiana State University and a Juris Doctor from the Loyola University New Orleans College of Law.

Career 
From 2011 to 2017, Stefanki worked as an attorney with the 15th Judicial District Public Defender's Office.  Stefanski was elected to the Louisiana House of Representatives in a March 25, 2017 special election and assumed office on April 10, 2017.  In the 2021–2022 legislative session, Stefanski chairs the House and Governmental Affairs Committee.  As chair of the committee, Stefanki manages redistricting after the 2020 United States census.

Stefanski is the co-owner of a law firm.  He has been mentioned as a possible candidate for attorney general of Louisiana in 2023.

References

External links

Living people
Louisiana lawyers
Republican Party members of the Louisiana House of Representatives
Louisiana State University alumni
Loyola University New Orleans College of Law alumni
People from Crowley, Louisiana
21st-century American politicians
Year of birth missing (living people)